Free Cuba may refer to:

Republic of Cuba, a period between 1902 and 1959 prior to the Cuban Revolution
Center for a Free Cuba